James Richard Cantalupo (November 14, 1943 – April 19, 2004) was an American businessman. He served as chairman and chief executive officer of McDonald's Corporation until his sudden death by heart attack at the age of 60.

Life

Cantalupo was born in Oak Park, Illinois, the eldest child in a family of Irish and Italian descent. His father was an optometrist and mother a homemaker. Cantalupo earned a degree in accounting from the University of Illinois at Urbana-Champaign, where he was admitted to the Zeta Psi fraternity.

He married, and had a daughter and son.

Career
He became a certified public accountant and worked for Arthur Young for eight years, where McDonald's was a client. He was offered the job of controller with a substantial salary increase with the then fast growing McDonald's before taking a month to decide, finally joining in 1974. In the same year he was promoted to vice president and senior vice president in 1981. He became president of McDonald's International in 1987 and its CEO in 1991.  He lost the top job to Jack Greenberg in 1999. McDonald's announced his retirement plans in April 2001, but on December 1 Greenberg resigned and Cantalupo agreed to stay on for another year to help with the management  transition.

Cantalupo succeeded as CEO and chairman on January 1, 2003. Shareholders were not impressed, thinking that his appointment indicated that the company was "inbred". However, credit was given to Cantalupo for the company's recovery in the succeeding 12 months: "he devised a plan" which included "accelerating the introduction of healthier foods, such as salads".

Cantalupo previously served on the board of directors of Sears, Roebuck and Company.  He was attending a McDonald's convention in Orlando, Florida when he was stricken with a heart attack and later died.

Notes

References
Reed, Christopher (2004) "Burger king who revived chain with salads: James Richard Cantalupo, Businessman, 1943-2004" (obituary reprinted from The Guardian) in The Sydney Morning Herald, 2004-04-22, p. 30

External links
McDonald's CEO Cantalupo dies suddenly; Bell succeeds - CNN/Money
Cantalupo's career at McDonald's - Reuters
Jim Cantalupo Biography

1943 births
2004 deaths
American accountants
American chief executives of food industry companies
American people of Italian descent
American people of Irish descent
Businesspeople from Florida
Businesspeople from Illinois
McDonald's people
Sears Holdings people
Gies College of Business alumni
People from Oak Park, Illinois
People from Orlando, Florida
20th-century American businesspeople
University of Illinois Urbana-Champaign alumni